Edouard Frere Champney (May 4, 1874 - June 4, 1929) was an architect in the United States. He worked on buildings that are now listed on the National Register of Historic Places (NRHP) and partnered with various architects including A. Warren Gould at Gould and Champney from 1909 until 1912, and Champney and Remey. He was principal at Édouard Frère Champney, Architect, Berkeley, California, 1926-1929.

Champney was born in Écouen, France, the son of the American painter James Wells Champney. He was named for his godfather, the French painter Pierre Édouard Frère.

Works
Carnegie Peace Palace (1909)
Seattle Electric Company Office Building (1910)
Seattle Civic Center Plan (1910)
New Richmond Hotel at 308 4th Avenue South in Pioneer Square, Seattle (1911) NRHP listed (Gould & Champney)
Seattle YWCA at 1118 Fifth Avenue and Seneca (1914) NRHP listed
1001 Terry Avenue Apartment Building in Seattle
"Elks Lodge": Benevolent and Protective Order of Elks Lodge #174 in Tacoma, Washington (1915)
Episcopal Diocese of Olympia, Saint Mark's Episcopal Cathedral #2 in Capitol Hill (1926 - 1930)
Rogers Building (1912) in Vancouver, Canada
Bekins Storage Company Warehouse Project in Seattle

References

External links
Édouard Frère Champney (Architect), extensive article with portrait
Findagrave entry

1874 births
1929 deaths
Architects from Seattle
People from Val-d'Oise
French emigrants to the United States